Anomalisa is a 2015 American adult stop motion animated psychological comedy-drama film written and directed by Charlie Kaufman, who co-directed with Duke Johnson. It was based on Kaufman's 2005 audio play of the same name under his alias Francis Fregoli, which is considered an exploration of the Fregoli delusion. Anomalisa follows British middle-aged customer service expert Michael Stone (David Thewlis), who perceives everyone (Tom Noonan) as identical but Lisa Hesselman (Jennifer Jason Leigh), whom he meets in a Cincinnati hotel.

Kaufman's audio play premiered in Los Angeles, and featured the voices of Thewlis, Noonan, and Leigh. He opposed adapting the play into a film, fearing loss of artistic merit, but began exploring the idea in 2012 after incorporating edits to the script. Filming faced delays as Starburns Industries initially secured production funding on Kickstarter only to adapt the play as a short film, with animation beginning in late 2013. The filmmakers faced struggles with stop-motion technology, a notoriously laborious medium. This was alleviated after Paramount Animation joined production, enabling the film to be expanded to a feature.

Anomalisa premiered at the Telluride Film Festival on September 4, 2015, and was theatrically released in the U.S. on December 30 by Paramount Pictures. The film received critical acclaim, with praise for its screenplay, direction, and thematic content. It was nominated for an Academy Award for Best Animated Feature, the first R-rated animated film to be nominated in this category, and was nominated for the Golden Globe Award for Best Animated Feature Film. It won the Grand Jury Prize at the 72nd Venice International Film Festival, the first animated film to do so.

Plot 
In 2005, middle-aged English-born lonely customer service expert and motivational speaker Michael Stone travels to Cincinnati, Ohio to promote his latest book at a convention in a hotel. He feels distant from everyone around him, whom he perceives as having an identical face and voice, including his wife and son. Michael practices his talk in his room in the fictional Fregoli Hotel, but is haunted by the memory of an angry letter from an old flame, Bella, whom he abruptly left years ago without an explanation. He arranges to meet her in the hotel bar; still upset, she is outraged by his invitation to his room and storms out. Going for a walk, Michael mistakes an adult toy store for a children's toy store. Wanting to buy his son a present, he goes in and discovers his mistake, but is fascinated by a Japanese animatronic doll behind the counter.

After taking a shower, Michael hears a unique female voice. He rushes from his room to find its owner: Lisa, an insecure young woman attending the convention with her friend Emily. Enraptured by her unique appearance and voice, he invites both women for drinks at the bar. Afterward, to Lisa's surprise, Michael invites her to his room. Captivated, he encourages her to sing (she chooses Cyndi Lauper's "Girls Just Want to Have Fun") and tell him about her life. After she calls herself an "anomaly", he nicknames her Anomalisa. They become intimate and have sex.

Michael has a nightmare in which the lower half of his face falls off and the identical people of the world pursue him, claiming that they love him and insisting that he and Lisa cannot be together. The dream inspires Michael to propose that he and Lisa start a new life together. She agrees, but her eating habits during breakfast annoy him, and her voice and face begin to transform into those of everyone else. During his convention talk, Michael suffers a breakdown, saying that he has no one to talk to and ranting about the American government, alienating the audience.

Michael returns to his home in Los Angeles, California. He gives the Japanese animatronic woman to his son, who is nonplussed. Michael's wife has arranged a surprise party, but he does not recognize any of the attendees, angering her. Michael sits alone on the stairs as the animatronic woman sings "Momotarō's Song", a Japanese children's song.

Lisa writes Michael a letter, saying she hopes they will meet again. Lisa's friend Emily, sitting beside her in the car, has her own unique face.

Cast 
 David Thewlis as Michael Stone, a middle-aged British English-born motivational speaker and customer service expert with a mostly negative attitude. To him, every person looks and sounds the same except Lisa, whom he perceives as different.
 Jennifer Jason Leigh as Lisa Hesselman, a sweet but insecure woman who has come to the hotel to attend Michael's talk about customer service.
 Tom Noonan as everyone else.

Production

Development 

The first version of Anomalisa was written and performed in 2005 for the Los Angeles run of "Theater of the New Ear", described as "a concert for music and text, or a set of 'sound plays'" by Carter Burwell, who commissioned and scored them. It was a double bill with Kaufman's Hope Leaves the Theater, and replaced Sawbones, by the Coen Brothers, from the earlier New York run, after that play's actors were unavailable. This Anomalisa was credited to the pen name Francis Fregoli, a reference to the Fregoli delusion, a disorder centered around the belief that different people are in fact a single person who changes appearance or is in disguise. The 2005 performance had Thewlis and Leigh sitting on opposite sides of the stage, with Noonan in the middle; Burwell conducted the Parabola Ensemble, and there was a foley artist.

Kaufman was initially opposed to turning the play into an animated film, saying that the play had "a disconnect between what's being said on stage and what the audience is seeing – there's Tom playing all these characters, there's Jennifer and David having sex while they're really just standing across the stage from each other and moaning. You'd lose that". The film was reinvented, although its script was described by The Guardian as "virtually the same" as that of the original play.

The film's production company, Starburns Industries, sought funding on Kickstarter to "produce this unique and beautiful film outside of the typical Hollywood studio system," where the company believed the film would be inevitably changed from its initial conception. Initially pitched as a short film "approximately 40 minutes in length", the team set a funding goal of $200,000. By the end of the campaign, 5,770 backers had pledged $406,237 to the project. After the success of the Kickstarter initiative, additional funding was secured by the film's production company, Starburns Industries, and the film was expanded to feature length.

Animation 
The puppets were created with 3D printers, with multiple copies of each character. Eighteen Michaels and six Lisas were created. Johnson recounted that the team was told that such realistic puppets would be "disturbing and off-putting", but disagreed, saying that the nature of stop-motion film, with human hands moving puppets for each frame, brought "organic life" to the medium. One goal of the film was for viewers to "forget they were looking at something animated and just get wrapped up in the scene", he said; "the challenge we felt with so much animated stuff is that you're always conscious of the animation, and we kept asking, 'What if we could escape that? What would it be like?'".

Kaufman and Johnson have described the process of stop-motion animation as "laborious" and found challenges in making the puppets look lifelike and relatable. Animator Dan Driscoll said they found people on whom to model the puppets, studied human movement and facial expressions to produce a precise result, created the puppets and built the sets, and finally placed the puppets on the sets and moved them frame by frame to create the illusion of movement. Kaufman said the medium of stop-motion underpins the narrative of Anomalisa by drawing attention to small details viewers would not notice in a live-action film.

The film was in production for more than two years.

Music

Release 
Anomalisa had its world premiere at the Telluride Film Festival on September 4, 2015. The film went on to screen at the Venice Film Festival on September 8 and the Toronto International Film Festival on September 15. Shortly after, Paramount Pictures acquired its worldwide distribution rights. The film had a limited release on December 30, 2015 and a wider release in January.

The film's DVD and Blu-ray packs were released on June 7, 2016. The Blu-ray Combo Pack with Digital HD includes an in-depth look at the filmmaking process with Kaufman and Johnson and three behind-the-scenes features, including an extended look at the production process and deeper themes of the story. Looks at the sound design and the ground-breaking techniques used to create one of the film's most intricate and intimate scenes are also shown. In the Blu-ray pack, thanks to the DTS-HD Master Audio 5.1 used in the film's production, ambient sound effects such as the hotel bar background can be perfectly heard and combined with the dialogue.

Critical response 
The website's critical consensus reads: "Anomalisa marks another brilliant and utterly distinctive highlight in Charlie Kaufman's filmography, and a thought-provoking treat for fans of introspective cinema." The film also has a weighted average score of 88 out of 100 on Metacritic based on 46 reviews, indicating "universal acclaim".

In Time Out David Calhoun awarded the film five out of five stars and wrote, "It's what you imagine might have happened if Charlie Kaufman had got his hands on Up in the Air or Lost in Translation." Drew McWeeny of Hitfix called it "the most shattering experiment yet from Charlie Kaufman" and graded it an A+. LA Weeklys Amy Nicholson gave the film an A and wrote, "Kaufman is taking our brains apart and showing us the gears." The Guardians Peter Bradshaw gave the film five out of five, naming it his film of the week, and wrote: "It is really funny, and incidentally boasts one of the most extraordinarily real sex scenes in film history. It also scared me the way a top-notch horror or a sci-fi dystopia might ... Is there anyone else in the movies doing such unique and extraordinary work?"

Observer critic Mark Kermode gave Anomalisa three out of five, writing: "Sometimes it falls apart ... But there's something magical about the malaise which raises this above mere misanthropy—a heightened sense of fragile life that perhaps only puppets could hope to achieve." Stephanie Zacharek of Time wrote: "Once you start reckoning with Anomalisas obsession with self-absorption, the novelty of this one-man pity party begins to wear off."

Top ten lists
Anomalisa was listed on numerous critics' top ten lists for 2015.

 1st – Drew McWeeny, HitFix
 1st – Aaron Hills, The Village Voice
 1st – Tim Grierson, Screen International
 2nd – Michael Phillips, Chicago Tribune
 2nd – Amy Nicholson, L.A. Weekly
 2nd – Alison Willmore, BuzzFeed
 2nd – Ella Taylor & Kristopher Tapley, Variety
 2nd – Glenn Kenny, RogerEbert.com
 2nd – Matt Singer, ScreenCrush
 2nd – Lou Lumenick, New York Post (tied with Inside Out)
 3rd – Alonso Duralde, TheWrap
 3rd – Matt Goldberg, Collider
 3rd – Ben Travers, Indiewire
 3rd – Matt Fagerholm, RogerEbert.com
 3rd – Dennis Dermody, Paper
 3rd – Will Leitch, The New Republic
 4th – Peter Sobczynski & Nick Allen, RogerEbert.com
 4th – The Guardian
 4th – John Powers, Vogue
 4th – Geoff Berkshire, Variety
 5th – Michael Atkinson, The Village Voice
 5th – Steve Persall, Tampa Bay Times
 5th – A.O. Scott, The New York Times (tied with Carol)
 6th – Kate Erbland, Indiewire
 6th – William Bibbiani, CraveOnline
 6th – Erin Whitney, ScreenCrush
 6th – Todd McCarthy, The Hollywood Reporter
 7th – Kyle Smith, New York Post
 7th – Jake Coyle, Associated Press
 7th – Mike D'Angelo, The A.V. Club
 7th – Eric Kohn & Jessica Kiang, Indiewire
 7th – Rafer Guzman, Newsday
 9th – Noel Murray, The A.V. Club
 10th – Rodrigo Perez, Indiewire
 10th – Peter Rainer, The Christian Science Monitor
 10th – Peter Travers, Rolling Stone (tied with Inside Out)
 Top 10 (listed alphabetically) – Steven Rea, The Philadelphia Inquirer
 Top 10 (listed alphabetically, not ranked) –  Stephen Whitty, The Star-Ledger

Accolades

References

External links 

 
 
 
 
 
 

2010s English-language films
2015 animated films
2015 films
2015 comedy-drama films
2010s American animated films
Adultery in films
American comedy-drama films
American independent films
Existentialist films
American films based on plays
Films directed by Charlie Kaufman
Kickstarter-funded films
Films with screenplays by Charlie Kaufman
2010s stop-motion animated films
HanWay Films films
Paramount Animation films
Paramount Pictures animated films
Paramount Pictures films
Films set in hotels
Films set in Cincinnati
Films set in Los Angeles
Films set in 2005
Venice Grand Jury Prize winners
Anifilm award winners
Films about depression
Films about writers
2015 independent films
American adult animated films
Films directed by Duke Johnson
American psychological drama films
2010s psychological drama films
Psychological comedy films
Psychological drama films